is a Latin phrase, meaning "hopping". It is used to mean that someone has reached a position or degree without going through the posts or lower grades according to the established order. For example, as in some Protestant churches, being consecrated bishop without first being ordained priest.

The phrase is also used in the legal term , meaning the possibility of seeking a resolution before a higher court, bypassing intermediate courts.

Latin legal terminology
Latin religious words and phrases